Paxton Pits is an area of active and disused gravel pits at Little Paxton near St Neots in Cambridgeshire, England.

The disused pits have been turned into a nature reserve with 77 hectares of lakes, meadow, grassland, scrub and woodland. The reserve is famous for its nightingales and cormorants and is home to a wide variety of other birds, insects, mammals and flora.

There are two marked self guided walking routes around the reserve, together with the Rivet Trail that follows the route of the Ouse Valley Way.

The circular 2 mile Heron Trail (the first mile of which is a hard surfaced track suitable for wheelchairs, pushchairs and all season walking) goes past lakes, through woodland and along the river bank, and which has three bird hides to view the water birds.

The circular 1.5 mile Meadow Trail goes through meadows and around lakes and is especially good for wildflowers in spring and summer and dragonflies on sunny days, although some of the paths become quite muddy in winter and during wet weather.

The reserve has free parking at the visitor and education centre, with a cafe and toilets.

External links
Paxton Pits
Huntingdonshire District Council

Nature reserves in Cambridgeshire